Amaranthus albus is an annual species of flowering plant.  It is native to the tropical Americas but a widespread introduced species in other places, including Europe, Africa and Australia.

Common names include common tumbleweed, tumble pigweed, tumbleweed, prostrate pigweed, pigweed amaranth, white amaranth and white pigweed.

Amaranthus albus is an annual herb up to 50 cm (20 inches) tall, forming many branches. Larger specimens turn into tumbleweeds when they die and dry out. The plant creates small, greenish flowers in clumps in the axils of the leaves. Male and female flowers are mixed together in the same clump.

In Cambodia, the leaves of the plant (which is known as phti sâ, Khmer language) is used as pig-feed, and are sometimes cooked and eaten by people.

References

External links

Jepson Manual Treatment

albus
Edible plants
Flora of South America
Plants described in 1759
Taxa named by Carl Linnaeus
Tumbleweeds